Muthukaalai is an Indian actor, comedian who predominantly works in Tamil cinema.

Early life and career
Muthukaalai was born in Rajapalayam and dreamt of becoming of a Stunt Choreographer. He attained black belt in Karate at the age of 18. He made his acting debut with Ponmanam (1997) and went on to portray comedic characters and he gained popularity with his appearances in the comedy tracks of Vadivelu.

Notable filmography

Kadhalan (1994)
Ponmanam (1997)
En Uyir Nee Thaane (1998)
Nilave Mugam Kaattu (1999)
Suyamvaram (1999)
Minsara Kanna (1999)
12B (2001)
Thavasi (2001)
 En Purushan Kuzhandhai Maadhiri  (2001)
Youth (2002)
Karmegham (2002)
Album (2002)
Anbe Sivam (2003)
Punnagai Poove (2003)
Diwan (2003)
Winner (2003)
Apthamitra (2004) (Kannada)
M. Kumaran Son of Mahalakshmi (2004)
Sorry Enaku Kalyanamayidichu (2005)
Selvam (2005)
Sudesi (2006)
Perarasu (2006)
Mozhi (2007)
Sivaji: The Boss (2007)
Cheena Thaana 001 (2007)
Valluvan Vasuki (2008)
Kathavarayan (2008)
Thoranai (2009)
Pattathu Yaanai (2013)
Pei Irukka Bayamen (2021)

References

External links

1965 births
Living people
Indian male film actors
Indian male comedians
Tamil comedians
Male actors in Tamil cinema